Goran Karanović (born 13 October 1987) is a Swiss-Serbian football forward for 1. Liga Promotion club Young Fellows Juventus.

Career
In September 2017, Karanović tore his cruciate ligament in his first match after recovering from the same injury.

International career
Karanović played twice for Switzerland U-21 in 2007.

Honours
Sepsi OSK
Cupa României runner-up: 2019–20

References

External links
 
 

1987 births
Living people
Footballers from Belgrade
Association football forwards
Swiss men's footballers
Serbian footballers
Swiss people of Serbian descent
FC Wohlen players
FC Luzern players
Servette FC players
SC Kriens players
FC St. Gallen players
Angers SCO players
FC Sochaux-Montbéliard players
FC Aarau players
Sepsi OSK Sfântu Gheorghe players
FC Hermannstadt players
Swiss Super League players
Liga I players
Expatriate footballers in France
Swiss expatriate sportspeople in France
Expatriate footballers in Romania
Swiss expatriate sportspeople in Romania
Swiss expatriate footballers
Switzerland under-21 international footballers
Serbian emigrants to Switzerland